Kilmanagh is an unincorporated community in Huron County in the U.S. state of Michigan.
 Brookfield Township (southeast corner)
 Sebewaing Township (southwest corner)
 Fairhaven Township (northwest corner)
 Winsor Township (northeast corner)

History
Kilmanagh was first called Thompson's Corners, for Francis Thompson, an Irish homesteader who arrived in 1861. The name Kilmanagh was first used to describe the nearby Shebeon Creek, which would overflow each spring. A post office named Kilmanagh operated from February 1873 until June 1904.

Government
School District serving the community are Elkton-Pigeon-Bay Port Schools and Owendale-Gagetown Area Schools.  The community is served by the Sebewaing based Post Office, Zip Code 48759.

References

Unincorporated communities in Huron County, Michigan
Unincorporated communities in Michigan